Wilkinson House is a historic house in Joelton, Tennessee, USA.

History
The two-story house was completed in 1932. It was designed by architect Clarence Kelley Colley in the Dutch Colonial Revival architectural style. Colley primarily designed public buildings to include the North Branch Carnegie Library in Nashville and the Perry County Courthouse. Colley also designed buildings located on university campuses, such as MTSU and Austin Peay State University, making the Wilkinson house unique as one of the few residential buildings designed by Colley. It was built in 1932 for Thomas Jefferson Wilkinson, a prominent Joelton resident. The house has served as the Kincer family residence during the last 50 years and three generations.

The interior of the house is largely intact, with few changes being made to the 1932 configuration of the rooms. The kitchen and bathrooms were updated in 1976, with both bathrooms being enlarged by expanding into the closet area of bedrooms. There are three contributing outbuildings on the property, all dating from the period of the construction of the house, the mid-1930s. Directly behind the house is a small gable front concrete-block building with asphalt shingle siding, originally used as a smokehouse and now used for storage. The Wilkinson House represents one of the few Colonial Revival houses constructed in the Joelton area in the first half of the twentieth century, and is the only known Dutch Colonial Revival house in the area. It has seen very few changes in its existence, and the property itself retains integrity as a small "gentleman's farm."

It was sold in the spring of 2018.

Architectural significance
It has been listed on the National Register of Historic Places since November 29, 2006.

References

Houses completed in 1932
Houses in Davidson County, Tennessee
Dutch Colonial Revival architecture in the United States
Houses on the National Register of Historic Places in Tennessee
National Register of Historic Places in Davidson County, Tennessee